Zumbastico Fantastico is a Chilean animation series broadcast by TVN and Cartoon Network Latin America. A showcase style show (as Cartoon Network's What A Cartoon Show), it contains different original animated shorts in every episode. Created and developed by Sólo por las Niñas (now Zumbastico Studios), co-produced with TVN and directed by Alvaro Ceppi. The series premiered on Cartoon Network Latin America from November 1, 2011.

5 different shows (with 6 shorts each) were showcase in the series:

 "Piggy-Doggy" ("Chanchiperri"), created by Bernardita Ojeda: It is about a cross between a pig and a dog that lives in the town of Goodness together with his assistant Perrichan, they will try to end the love of their town. 
 "The League of Semi-Heroes" ("La liga de los semi-heroes"), created by Claudio "Guayi" Mas: A group of three pre-adolescents who seek to be superheroes, follow the orders of General Cochijunti, who always gives them simple and not dangerous missions.
 "Edgar's Amazing Navel" ("El sorprendente ombligo de Edgar"), created by Pablo Castillo: Edgar, a boy who by not washing his navel has created a strange world within himself.
 "Telonio and his Demons" ("Telonio y sus demonios"), created by Sol Díaz: Telonio is a boy who is good at playing Jazz, he is in love with his partner Melodia and the demons that live in his head commonly lower his self-esteem.
 "Pepe, a square in a round world" ("Pepe, un cuadrado en un mundo redondo"), created by Alvaro Ceppi: Pepe is a square who lives in a circular city, so he has to deal with the circle people.

References

Chilean animated television series
2011 Chilean television series debuts
2012 Chilean television series endings
2010s Chilean television series
2010s animated television series
2010s animated comedy television series
Animated television series about children
Animated television series about dogs
Animated television series about pigs
Black comedy television shows
Chilean children's animated comedy television series
Chilean children's animated television series
Demons in television
Flash television shows
Jazz television series
Parody superheroes
Surreal comedy television series
Superhero comedy television series
Supervillain television shows